
Nicosia is the capital of Cyprus.

Nicosia may also refer to:

Places

Cyprus
 North Nicosia, capital of Northern Cyprus (de facto state recognized only by Turkey)

Administrative units
 Nicosia Municipality, governing body of south Nicosia
 Nicosia Turkish Municipality, governing body of North Nicosia
 Nicosia District, the Republic of Cyprus district surrounding Nicosia
 Lefkoşa District, the Northern Cyprus district surrounding North Nicosia

Italy
 Nicosia, Sicily, comune in the Province of Enna

People
Emanuele Nicosia (1953–2016), Italian automobile designer 
Felice da Nicosia, Italian saint
Gerald Nicosia (born 1949), American author, poet, journalist, interviewer, and literary critic
Judith Nicosia, American soprano and professor of voice
Nic Nicosia, American art photographer
Steve Nicosia (born 1955), American baseball player
Nic Nicosia (born 1951), American art photographer 
Nicosia Lawson, Cayman Islands beauty queen